The following lists events that happened during 2006 in the Gambia.

Incumbents

President: Yahya Jammeh 
Chief Justice: Stephen Alan Brobbey (until February 6) Abdou Kareem Savage (starting February 22)

Events

June
 June 15 - Hundreds are wounded in fighting between rival factions of the Movement of the Democratic Forces of Casamance led by Salif Sadio, who supports the continuation of the Casamance conflict, and Magne Dieme, who supports reconciliation with the government of Senegal. The fighting has spread to the Gambia and Guinea-Bissau may intervene.

References

 
Years of the 21st century in the Gambia
2000s in the Gambia
Gambia
Gambia